Actia ciligera is a species of parasitic fly in the family Tachinidae.

References

Further reading

 
 

ciligera
Articles created by Qbugbot
Insects described in 1954